Garzê Tibetan Autonomous Prefecture, often shortened to Ganzi Prefecture, is an autonomous prefecture in the western arm of Sichuan province, China bordering Yunnan to the south, the Tibet Autonomous Region to the west, and Gansu to the north and northwest.

The population is approximately 880,000, with Tibetans accounting for 77.8% of the total population. The capital city of Garzê is Kangding (Dartsedo).

History
Garzê was traditionally part of the historical region of Kham.

During the period of rule by the Republic of China (1912–49), Garzê became nominally part of the province of Xikang, which included parts of former Kham.

In 1930, the Tibetan army invaded Garzê, capturing it without much resistance. However, in 1932, the Tibetan army withdrew after suffering defeats elsewhere at the hands of the warlord of Qinghai, Ma Bufang. Chinese warlord Liu Wenhui reoccupied Garzê, and signed an agreement with the Tibetans formalizing his control of the area east of the upper Yangtze, which corresponds roughly with eastern Kham (see Sino-Tibetan War).

In 1950, following the defeat of the Kuomintang forces by the People's Liberation Army, the area fell within the control of the People's Republic of China. Eastern Xikang was merged with Sichuan in 1955, where Garzê became an Autonomous Prefecture.

Population
According to the census of 2000, Garzê had a registered population of 897,239 (population density: 5.94 people/km2).

Languages
Garzê is linguistically diverse, having many variants of Tibetan as well as several Qiangic languages:
Kangding: Guiqiong, Muya
Luding County: Muya
Danba County: rGyalrong
Jiulong County: Pumi (Southern)
Yajiang County: Zhaba
Dawu County: Horpa
Xinlong County: Queyu

Religion
Tibetan Buddhism is historically the predominant religion practiced in Garzê. Some notable Gompas here include:
Dzogchen Monastery
Dzongsar Monastery
Kandze Monastery
Kharnang Monastery
Nanwu Si Monastery
Palpung Monastery
Sershul Monastery
Tongkor Monastery
Larung Gar Buddhist Institute
Yarchen Gar Buddhist Institute

Subdivisions 
Garzê comprises 1 county-level city and 17 counties:

Notes

External links 

 Official website of Garzê Tibetan Autonomous Prefecture
 Travel information on Garzê TAP towns and villages : along the Northern and Southern Sichuan-Tibet Highways, Tagong (in between both highways), Daocheng and Yading (south of both highways)
 Traditional folk houses in Garze, Sichuan

 
Tibetan autonomous prefectures
Prefecture-level divisions of Sichuan